Timur Petrovich Novikov (September 24, 1958, Leningrad – May 23, 2002, St. Petersburg) was a Russian visual artist, designer, art theorist, philosopher, and musician. He is considered one of the most influential proponents of Nonconformist Art before and after the dissolution of the Soviet Union in 1991.

Life and work

As he grew up in the Soviet Union, Novikov experienced its cultural and political constraints. His artistic education began at the age of seven at the House of Pioneers in Leningrad (now St. Petersburg), and later at the Young Art Historians Club at the Russian Museum in the same city.

In 1977 he became a member of the Letopis (Chronicles) art group; and in 1982 he founded the Новый художник (New Artists) movement. During the 1980s Novikov worked at the Russian Museum and enjoyed access to its collection and archive, as well as close working relationships with its curators. This connection lasted to when he started work as an artist. In 1990 and 1991 he studied as an intern at the Institut des Arts Plastiques (Institute of Plastic Arts) in Paris, France.

During the 1980s and 1990s Novikov was a regular participant in the Pop Mechanics show of experimental composer Sergey Kuryokhin and worked on its stage design. Several pop groups from the show worked with him to explore a new visual and stage design. In 1983 Novikov founded and led an experimental rock-group Новые композиторы (New Composers) and invented new musical instruments for it. He was also involved in a number of film projects as an actor and artist, and made a name as an innovative film designer. In 1987 Novikov shared the Nika Award for his contribution to the popular Russian film Assa, directed by Sergei Solovyov.

The New Academy of Fine Arts, founded by Novikov in 1989, soon became a well-known meeting point for the Leningrad, Russian, and international art scene and a symbol for the spirit of freedom and recomposition in the new Russia. The academy and artist community, named also after its address Pushkinskaya 10, was at first self-organized by artists. It later offered ateliers as well as regular courses for students, including scholarships. The academy, with Novikov as one of its most prominent teachers, was sometimes referred to as an underground art project, but also cooperated with established art institutions, among them the Russian Museum and the Hermitage Museum.

The core conception of the academy was called Neo-Academism and comprised a specific teacher-student relationship as well as a focus on the historic and aesthetic perspective of Neoclassicism.

Novikov also contributed to numerous art exhibitions outside Russia. His style of painting combined a bold avant-garde attitude with refined classically based conceptions of Neo-Academism. Furthermore, he contributed to contemporary art theory, writing books such as "The New Russian Classicism" (1998), "Horizons" (2000), and "Intercontacts" (2000), published by the Russian Museum.

A lengthy illness led to blindness in the later part of Novikov's career. He continued working as a lecturer at the New Academy and led assistants to work on graphic works. Novikov died of pneumonia on May 23, 2002, in St. Petersburg.

Posthumous exhibitions of Novikov's works were held at the Moscow Russian Museum and in Brussels in 2002, in Denmark 2004, London 2005 and 2012, and several times in St. Petersburg. 
In spring 2013 the Moscow Museum of Modern Art presented a large-scale solo retrospective of Novikov's work, curated by Ekaterina Andreeva, the leading academic researcher at the State Russian Museum and author of Novikov's biography.

Popular culture
In 2015, the estate of Timur Novikov collaborated with Russian street wear designer Gosha Rubchinskiy. The resulting collection consisted of T-shirts, sweatshirts and caps incorporating designs from Novikov's work. The 'eternal sun' motif is the standout design element and had previously been appropriated by Rubchinskiy, who greatly reveres his art. The pieces were very well received, selling out within minutes on the Dover Street Market e-shop.

Public collections
Aboa Vetus & Ars Nova (Museum of History and Contemporary Art), Turku, Finland
Art Museum of Estonia, Tallinn, Estonia
ART4.RU Contemporary Art Museum, Moscow
Centre Georges Pompidou, Paris
Frederick R. Weisman Museum of Art, Los Angeles
Kaliningrad State Art Gallery, Kaliningrad, Russia
Ludwig Museum, Budapest
State Museum of the History of St. Petersburg, St. Petersburg
Museum of Modern Art, Vienna
 Museum of the New Academy of Fine Arts, St. Petersburg
Museum of Political History of Russia, St. Petersburg
National Center for Contemporary Arts, Moscow
 Orel Regional Museum of Fine Art, Orel, Russia
Pozhalostin Regional and State Art Museum, Ryazan, Russia
 Ruarts Foundation, Moscow
Schwules Museum, Berlin
Shchusev State Museum of Architecture, Moscow
Simferopol State Art Museum, Simferopol, Crimea
State Russian Museum, St. Petersburg
State Tretyakov Gallery, Moscow
Stedelijk Museum, Amsterdam
Tate Modern, London
Tsaritsyno Museum, Moscow
 Tver Regional Picture Gallery, Tver, Russia
Victoria and Albert Museum, London
Zimmerli Art Museum at Rutgers University, New Brunswick, New Jersey

References

External links 
 "Wild Youth: Timur Novikov and the 1980s St. Petersburg Art Scene"
 "The Radical Artist Who Shaped Russian Youth Culture"
 "A "Non-aligned" Intelligentsia: Timur Novikov's Neo-avantgarde and the Afterlife of Leningrad's Non-conformism"
 GIF.ru: Art projects and collaborations
 artnet.com: List of works and exhibitions
 Guelman.ru: List of works in collections
 artinfo.ru: List of single and group exhibitions
 

Russian contemporary artists
Postmodern artists
Underground artists
Soviet Nonconformist Art
20th-century Russian painters
Russian male painters
21st-century Russian painters
Russian printmakers
Russian photographers
Russian film directors
Russian graphic designers
1958 births
2002 deaths
Soviet artists
20th-century printmakers
20th-century Russian male artists
21st-century Russian male artists